Elementary is an American crime drama created by Robert Doherty and loosely based on Sherlock Holmes and other characters appearing in the works of Sir Arthur Conan Doyle. The series stars Jonny Lee Miller, Lucy Liu, Aidan Quinn, and Jon Michael Hill and premiered on CBS on September 27, 2012. On December 17, 2018, it was announced that the series would end after the seventh season.

Series overview

Episodes

Season 1 (2012–13)

Season 2 (2013–14)

Season 3 (2014–15)

Season 4 (2015–16)

Season 5 (2016–17)

</onlyinclude>

Season 6 (2018)
{{Episode table|background=#405760|overall=5|season=5| title=22|director=15|writer=26|airdate=11|viewers=9|country=U.S.|episodes=

Season 7 (2019)

Home video releases

References

External links

E
Sherlock Holmes television series